La Apartada is a town and municipality located in the Córdoba Department, northern Colombia, its population is 13.072.

References
 Gobernacion de Cordoba - La Apartada
 La Apartada official website

Municipalities of Córdoba Department